Highwater Creek is a stream in Redwood and Cottonwood counties, in the U.S. state of Minnesota.

Highwater Creek was named from its potential for flash flooding during heavy rain.

See also
List of rivers of Minnesota

References

Rivers of Cottonwood County, Minnesota
Rivers of Redwood County, Minnesota
Rivers of Minnesota